Roderick Leffanue (3 January 1913 – 12 April 1991) was a former Australian rules footballer who played with Carlton and South Melbourne in the Victorian Football League (VFL).

Notes

External links 

Roderick Leffanue's profile at Blueseum

1913 births
1991 deaths
Carlton Football Club players
Sydney Swans players
Australian rules footballers from Victoria (Australia)